The Cornelius Low House (also called Ivy Hall) is a Georgian manor in Piscataway, Middlesex County, New Jersey, United States, built in 1741 at Raritan Landing. The Cornelius Low House is listed on the New Jersey Register of Historic Places and National Register of Historic Places. The house currently holds the Cornelius Low House/Middlesex County Museum.

History

Cornelius Low, Jr. 
Cornelius Low Jr. (c. 1700–1777) was the third of fifteen children.  His grandfather, Peter Cornellessen Low, left Holland for the American colonies in 1659 and settled near Kingston, New York.  Peter's eldest son, Cornelius Low, moved to New York and established himself as a merchant.  He married Margareta Van Borsum in 1695. During the 1720s, Cornelius Low, Jr. became a successful merchant in Newark, New Jersey. In 1729, he married Johanna Gouveneur and they made plans to move to the emerging port community of Raritan Landing, near New Brunswick.  Having shipping capabilities, Low became one of the community's most prosperous businessmen.

During a great flood in 1738, Low lost his first home, located along the wharf near Landing Lane, in Raritan. Low obtained property for a new house on the bluff, opposite  the Great Road (River Road) and overlooking the Landing. Low called the new home the “new house on the mountain,” referring to an entry in his family Bible.  The new location allowed Low to keep a watchful eye on the activities at the wharves, and especially at his warehouse located between the river and the Great Road.

Cornelius Low died in early 1777, but the British spared his house because his loyalty to the King of England remained steadfast until his death.

Architecture 
The main portion of the home  measures forty feet by thirty feet and originally included a -story kitchen wing. When it was built, it was one of the largest and most expensive in the province of East Jersey. It was built with more than 350 tons of sandstone. While most of the homes at Raritan Landing had stone foundations, this was the only house to have been built entirely out of stone. Today, the community of Raritan Landing is all but forgotten. The remains of the once-thriving village lie beneath portions of Johnson Park and River Road.  The Low House is one of two remaining structures from the Landing and is a vital link to Piscataway and Middlesex County history.

Low wished the front of his home to reflect his stature as one of the most influential and prosperous men of the community. To that end, a ledge, or sill course, sits approximately three feet up from the ground and encircles the house.  This sill makes the house appear to be sitting on a pedestal. Low purchased large, rectangular blocks of high quality stone for the front facade (facing the river and the community of Raritan Landing), most likely quarried in the Newark area. Low was a frugal man and the only finely dressed stone is on the side of the house facing Raritan Landing. The other three sides were built of less expensive rubble stone, or irregular pieces that required minimal dressing.

Kitchen "ghost" 
It is believed the Metlar family removed the kitchen wing around 1870.. A shadow, or kitchen "ghost," of the removed structure is visible on the exterior due to the different colored mortar between the stones. Within the shadow, an outline of the doorway that led into this room is visible.  Due to its proximity to the kitchen, this room was most likely used primarily for dining or entertaining.

Delft tiles
The fireplaces in the Low House contain original 18th century Delft tiles. Delft tiles take their name from the city Delft, in Holland, where the tiles were first created in the 16th century.  Until that time, tiles had been used as flooring and were made from red clay.  By the end of the 16th century the tiles were used as wall tiles in many homes. Dutch houses were built near the water and, given the climate, tiles were ideal for keeping out the dampness and were used on the joining of walls and floors and for walls behind fireplaces..

Restoration

Preservation 
The five families that have owned the property—the Lows, Pools, Metlars, Voorhees and the Strongs—took their charge very seriously. They were, for the most part, wealthier families who could economically afford the maintenance necessary with a property such as this. The Low House today is one of only two remaining structures from Raritan Landing, and is considered one of the finest examples of Georgian-style architecture in America.

In 1979, Middlesex County, New Jersey bought the house and grounds. Under the guidance and administration of the Middlesex County Cultural and Heritage Commission. The County acquired the Low House to use as a local heritage museum for discussing the history of New Jersey and its context within that of national events.

Exterior restoration 
While the house was in fair condition when obtained by the county, some changes were made.  A garage and pool were removed from the back yard, and a new parking area was created next to the building.  The ivy, which caused people to refer to the house as “Ivy Hall,” was removed. The entire roof, including the badly deteriorated support structure, was replaced in 1982–1983. Cedar shingles replaced the slate tiles that had been put on decades earlier.  In 1987–1988, restoration replicas were installed to replace badly worn windows on the side of the house facing the water.

During the 1990s, a massive restoration was initiated to address major issues plaguing the Low House. In 1995, the Cultural and Heritage Commission and the Board of Chosen Freeholders accepted a grant from the New Jersey State Historic Trust for the restoration of the Low House. Under the guidance of Ford Farwell Mills and Gatch architects of Princeton, the restoration took place between 1995 and 1996. The Commission also installed new landscaping and built an "interpretive path," which included installations that tell the history of the house.  The front facade was also repointed.

The first and second floor windows are approximately three inches off square and appear crooked. Originally, the two basement windows closest to the front entrance were doorways. These allowed access to the basement for Low's servants and workers so that certain goods could be stored there rather than in the warehouse along the Great Road. The front yard has since been substantially filled but the doorway outlines are still visible in the basement.  Sometime after Low's death, these doorways were altered and turned into windows. Subsequently, the house settled and these windows are no longer square. In the mid-1980s, the front windows, having been severely exposed to the elements, were replaced.  Rather than square up the window openings, the restoration firm installed fully functional, though crooked, windows in their place.

Interior restoration 
From 1995 through most of 1996, Arvid Myhre Building Construction Company of Frenchtown, New Jersey completed the physical rehabilitation of the house. 26 layers of paint were stripped from the woodwork which was then repainted in historically accurate colors. Behind-the-scenes work included complete upgrades of heating and cooling systems, new electrical wiring encased in metal conduit, a state-of-the-art dry-feed fire suppression system, and new plumbing and water supply systems. Additionally, an exhibit system was fabricated to protect the original plaster walls, while still allowing the museum to install changing exhibitions.

Archaeology 

Prior to restoration, an archaeological study of the grounds was undertaken, led by Hunter Research of Trenton. These digs yielded a wide variety of objects including clay pipe fragments, Delft tiles, glass pieces, and a British military button. The artifacts would help give more clues to what was going on in and around this house over the years, and would also confirm previous theories and thoughts regarding its history.

Timeline
 1738 Cornelius Low purchases  of land from William Williamson, on the bluff overlooking Landing Lane
 1741 Low moves into his "new house on the mountain" and remains there until his death in 1777
 1793 John Pool purchases the property from Cornelius Low's son, Nicholas Low
 1871 George W. Metlar acquires the house from John Adams Pool's widow for $14,000
 1916 Anna Voorhees obtains the house through sale from the Metlar family
 1937 The house was documented by the Historic American Buildings Survey
 1965 Stephen Van Rensselaer Strong purchases the property from Theodore Voorhees for $1
 1979 Middlesex County, New Jersey takes title to the house, buying it from Stephen's widow, Marianne Strong, for $160,000

References

External links

Middlesex County Office of Arts and History: Cornelius Low House

Houses completed in 1741
Historic house museums in New Jersey
Museums in Middlesex County, New Jersey
Low
Houses on the National Register of Historic Places in New Jersey
Historic American Buildings Survey in New Jersey
Georgian architecture in New Jersey
Low
National Register of Historic Places in Middlesex County, New Jersey
Piscataway, New Jersey
Stone houses in New Jersey